Metropolitan Athanasius may refer to:

 Athanasius, Metropolitan of Moscow in 1564–1566
 Athanasius, Metropolitan of Beni Suef in 1962–2000